Mart Jüssi (born 21 March 1965 in Tallinn) is an Estonian ecologist and politician. He has been member of XI Riigikogu.

His father is biologist, nature writer and photographer Fred Jüssi and his mother is journalist and translator Helju Jüssi. He is a member of the party Estonian Greens.

References

1965 births
Living people
Estonian ecologists
Estonian Greens politicians
Members of the Riigikogu, 2007–2011
University of Tartu alumni
People from Tallinn
Politicians from Tallinn